Cropsey Township is located in McLean County, Illinois. As of the 2010 census, its population was 222 and it contained 90 housing units. It was named after Col. A. J. Cropsey, the owner of a large farm in the area. In 1860 there were 25 families living in the township; by the 2000 census the total population was reported at 256.

Geography

Demographics

References

External links
City-data.com
Illinois State Archives

Townships in McLean County, Illinois
Populated places established in 1857
Townships in Illinois
1857 establishments in Illinois